Turks of Croatia, also referred to as Turkish Croatians or Croatian Turks, are one among 22 recognised national minorities in Croatia. According to the 2011 census, there were 367 Turks living in Croatia, most of which most lived in Primorje-Gorski Kotar County and later in the City of Zagreb.

Turks compose approximately 0.001% of the total population. The majority of Croatian Turks are Sunni Muslims, and make up 0.5% of Croatia's Muslim population (56,777 Muslims in total).

History 

During the Croatian-Ottoman Wars of the 15th and 16th centuries, parts of Croatia were incorporated into the Ottoman Empire and settled by Turks. However, the majority of these retreated to other parts of Rumelia or Anatolia after the end of Ottoman rule. Many ethnic Turks in Croatia today are from more recent immigrations from the mid-20th century onwards.

Culture 

In the Independent State of Croatia, the Croatian Muslim Printing House issued a magazine in Turkish language intended for the Turkish public, the European turkologists and those in the Independent State of Croatia who spoke Turkish language. The magazine was called The East and the West: the Cultural, Economic, Social and Political Magazine. It was issued between 6 April 1943 and 15 August 1944. It was the first magazine in Turkish language on the territory of the present-day Croatia and Bosnia and Herzegovina, and second on the territory of the former Yugoslavia.

Population

Statistics 

Cities with significant Turkish minority:

 Umag (29 or 0.22%)
 Trogir (16 or 0.12%)
 Rijeka (42 or 0.03%)
 Slavonski Brod (18 or 0.03%)
 Zagreb (106 or 0.01%)
 Split (16 or 0.01%)

Notable people
Banu Alkan, Turkish actress

See also 
 Croatia–Turkey relations
 Turkish minorities in the former Ottoman Empire
 Turks in the Balkans

References

Notes

Journals 

 

Ethnic groups in Croatia
Muslim communities in Europe
Croatia
Middle Eastern diaspora in Croatia
Croatia